Teleost hatching enzyme may refer to:
 Choriolysin L, an enzyme
 Choriolysin H, an enzyme